The Chiang Ching-kuo Memorial Hall is a memorial hall dedicated to former President of the Republic of China Chiang Ching-kuo located in Jinning Township, Kinmen County, Taiwan.

History
The memorial hall was built in 1989. On 6 July 2008, the memorial hall was reopened in a ceremony attended by legislator Chen Fu-hai, Fujian Province Governor Hsueh Hsiang-chuan, Magistrate Lee Chu-feng, local officials, elected representatives and Chiang Ching-kuo's friends. The memorial hall was closed for renovation from 20 June until 30 November 2019 and was reopened at the end of 2019.

Exhibitions
The exhibition area of the memorial hall is divided into two part, which are the life of Chiang Ching-kuo and Chiang Ching-kuo's time in Kinmen.

See also
 List of tourist attractions in Taiwan
 Touliao Mausoleum

References

1989 establishments in Taiwan
Buildings and structures completed in 1989
Buildings and structures in Kinmen County
Chiang Ching-kuo
Jinning Township
Monuments and memorials in Taiwan
Tourist attractions in Kinmen County